William Frederick Jones (1827 – 16 February 1871) was a convict transported to Western Australia, and later became one of the colony's ex-convict school teachers.

Born in 1827, Jones was the mate on a trading ship in his youth.  He eventually qualified as a ship's master, but in March 1856 he arrived in Western Australia on board the William Hammond, having been transported for fifteen years for uttering a forged bank note.  After receiving his ticket of leave, he was appointed a school teacher at Picton.  He taught there from 1859 to 1870. In April 1861 he married an Irish immigrant girl named Rose Ann Breen.  He resigned in 1870, and died in Bunbury a year later.

References
 
 

1827 births
1871 deaths
Convicts transported to Western Australia
Settlers of Western Australia
Australian schoolteachers
Place of birth missing
Date of birth missing